Oligoryzomys fulvescens, also known as the fulvous colilargo, fulvous pygmy rice rat, or northern pygmy rice rat, is a species of rodent in the genus Oligoryzomys of family Cricetidae. It is found from southern Mexico through Central America into South America, where it occurs south into Peru and Brazil, and includes numerous synonyms, including the type species of the genus, Oryzomys navus Bangs, 1899. The taxonomy of this species is unresolved, and it may be found to contain more than one species. Its karyotype has 2n = 54-60 and FNa = 68–74.

References

Literature cited
Duff, A. and Lawson, A. 2004. Mammals of the World: A checklist. New Haven: A & C Black. .

Weksler, M., Aguilera, M. and Reid, F. 2008. . In IUCN. IUCN Red List of Threatened Species. Version 2009.2. <www.iucnredlist.org>. Downloaded on November 27, 2009.

Rodents of Central America
Mammals of Brazil
Mammals of Colombia
Mammals of Ecuador
Mammals of Guyana
Mammals of Mexico
Mammals of Peru
Mammals of Suriname
Mammals of Venezuela
Mammals described in 1860
Taxa named by Henri Louis Frédéric de Saussure
Oligoryzomys